Kuçovë is a municipality in south-central Albania. It was formed at the 2015 local government reform by the merger of the former municipalities Kozare, Kuçovë, Lumas and Perondi, which all became municipal units. The seat of the municipality is the town of Kuçovë. The population of the former municipality at the 2011 census was 12,654.

History

Ancient 
Archaeologists found in the village of Katundas near Kuçovë six phases of inhabitation dating to the Neolithic, Chalcolithic, Bronze Age, Iron Age, urban Illyrian and the Late Antiquity era.

Modern 
Kuçova has been an industrial city since the Italian influence in the early 1920s. In 1928 in “Dikatër” was drilled the first oil hole in Albania. From this moment onwards the city has been on oil drilling maps. Since 1928, the Italian company AIPA had an agreement with the Zog I government that if the oil extraction would surpass 50,000 tonnes per year, this company would build a refinery in Albania. In 1939 Albania was occupied by Italians and therefore, though the oil extracted was more than 170,000 ton, the refinery was never built and the oil was transported to Italy.

Qyteti Stalin
During Communist Albania the city was renamed to Stalin City and was a closed military district. The city was extensively developed in the 1950s and is of interest to students of communist architecture, although following the collapse of communism there has been much unauthorised building and modification to the original buildings. It is home to one airbase of the Albanian Air Force, although since 2005 the country's air force has ceased flying the aged MiG fighters provided by the Soviet Union and China and has been reduced to rotary wing aircraft only.

Economy
Kuçova is one of Albania's cities known for its oil industry along with Patos and Ballsh. The Oil industry was originally developed by the Italians during the King Zog period, and much of the infrastructure is dated. Following the end of the communist period the town suffered a severe industrial decline, with the closure of many factories and the destruction of the towns power plan in the riots following the failure of the pyramid banks. Today there is some evidence of a recovery with a large number of micro-businesses operating from former state run factories, although unemployment remains high. There are also a number of foreign owned banks and a small number of ATMs. Like many towns in Albania many young people immigrate abroad to seek employment.

Population
Currently the Kuçova district has a population of around 50,000. Of this population around 31,000 live in the city of Kuçova, classifying it as 12th of 65 municipalities on a national scale. Population density is 567 inhabitants/km2, which ranks the Kuçova district as the most heavily populated on a national scale. Another feature of this district compared with others in Albania is that city dwellers comprise 63% of the general population, the remainder living in villages nearby.

The city of Kuçova has 5 neighbourhoods, Lgj. "11 Janari", Lgj. "Llukan Prifti", Lgj."11 Shkurti", Lgj. "Tafil Skendo", and "1 Maji". One of the largest parks in Kuçovë is called "Pishat" (The Pines). Like many other Albanian cities, Kuçova has a lot of coffee bars, restaurants and some hotels.

Education
There are two public high schools in the city, General High School (Shkolla e Mesme e Përgjithshme) "Myrteza Kepi" and General High School Kuçovë (Shkolla e Mesme e Përgjithshme Kucovë) and one non public high school. There are also five 1st to 9th grade schools; "18 Tetori", "28 Nentori", "Gaqi Karakashi", "23 Nentori" and "Deshmorët e Kombit". High school graduates who want to pursue a higher education go to other Albanian cities or outside the country.

Sports
The football club is KF Naftëtari Kuçovë. Currently playing in the Albanian Second Division. And their stadium is Bashkim Sulejmani Stadium with a capacity of 5,000 spectators.

Twin towns – sister cities 
Kuçovë is twinned with:

 Ramla, Israel

Notable people
Ilir Bozhiqi, retired soccer player (goalkeeper)
Eltjon Valle, artist, born in Kuçova in 1984
Dr. Flori, singer
Agim Shuka, Albanian actor

References

External links
Kuçovë Municipality
Kucova Community

 
Closed cities
Municipalities in Berat County
Administrative units of Kuçovë
De-Stalinization
Populated places established in 2015